The Ezekiel Sawin House is a historic house located in Fairhaven, Massachusetts.

Description and history 
The two-story, wood-framed house was built between 1840 and 1844 by Ezekiel Sawin, president of the Fairhaven Bank. It is an elaborate and distinctive expression of Greek Revival styling, with a wraparound porch supported by Ionic columns, and wide corner pilasters. The house also has some Federal elements including a balustrade at the edge of the roof.

The house was listed on the National Register of Historic Places on June 15, 1979.

See also
National Register of Historic Places listings in Bristol County, Massachusetts

References

Houses in Bristol County, Massachusetts
Fairhaven, Massachusetts
Houses on the National Register of Historic Places in Bristol County, Massachusetts
Houses completed in 1844
Greek Revival houses in Massachusetts